John Edward Schella (May 9, 1947 – August 3, 2018) was a Canadian professional ice hockey player who played 385 games in the World Hockey Association and 115 games in the National Hockey League. After three seasons in the minor leagues, Schella made his NHL debut in 1970 with the Vancouver Canucks, spending parts of two seasons with the team before moving to the Houston Aeros of the WHA, where he spent six seasons. Schella played one final year in the minor leagues before retiring in 1979.

Career statistics

Regular season and playoffs

References

External links

1947 births
2018 deaths
Binghamton Dusters players
Canadian ice hockey defencemen
Denver Spurs players
Houston Aeros (WHA) players
Houston Apollos players
Ice hockey people from Ontario
Peterborough Petes (ice hockey) players
Rochester Americans players
San Diego Mariners (PHL) players
Sportspeople from Thunder Bay
Vancouver Canucks players